Senticolis is a genus of nonvenomous snake in the family Colubridae. The genus Senticolis is monotypic, containing the sole species Senticolis triaspis, also known as the green rat snake. The species is endemic to Central America, Mexico, southern Arizona, and southern New Mexico.

Description
Dorsally, it is green or olive green, and ventrally it is light yellow. The head is elongated, the body is slender, and the smooth dorsal scales are arranged in 31-39 rows.

Habitat
Senticolis triaspis usually inhabits evergreen forests and grassland.

Geographic range
Senticolis triaspis is well distributed in the Baboquivari, Pajarito, Atascosa, Santa Rita, Empire, Patagonia, Chiricahua, Swisshelm, Pedregosa, and Peloncillo mountains of southeastern Arizona.

Diet
Senticolis triaspis consumes small animals such as lizards, birds, and bats, killing them by deadly constriction.

Behavior
Senticolis triaspis is  primarily diurnal.

Reproduction
During reproduction, an adult female of S. triaspis is able to lay up to 9 eggs in a clutch.

Subspecies
Three subspecies are recognized as being valid, including the nominotypical subspecies.
Senticolis triaspis intermedia  – Arizona, New Mexico, northern Mexico
Senticolis triaspis mutabilis  – Central America
Senticolis triaspis triaspis  – southern Mexico

Nota bene: A trinomial authority in parentheses indicates that the subspecies was originally described in a genus other than Senticolis.

References

External links

Further reading
Behler, John L.; F. Wayne King (1979). The Audubon Society Field Guide to North American Reptiles and Amphibians. New York: Alfred A. Knopf. 743 pp., 657 plates. . (Elaphe triaspis, p. 608 + Plate 479).
Cope ED (1866). "Fourth Contribution to the HERPETOLOGY of Tropical America". Proc. Acad. Nat. Sci. Philadelphia 18: 123–132. (Coluber triaspis, new species, p. 128).
Dowling, Herndon G.; Isabelle Fries (1987). "A Taxonomic Study of the Ratsnakes. VIII. A Proposed New Genus for Elaphe Triaspis (Cope)". Herpetologica 43 (2): 200–207. (Senticolis, new genus).
Schmidt, Karl P.; D. Dwight Davis (1941). Field Book of Snakes of the United States and Canada. New York: G.P. Putnam's Sons. 365 pp., 34 plates, 103 figures. (Elaphe chlorosoma, p. 146).
Smith, Hobart M.; Edmund D. Brodie, Jr. (1982). Reptiles of North America: A Guide to Field Identification. New York: Golden Press. 240 pp.  (paperback),  (hardcover). (Elaphe triaspis, pp. 184–185).
Stebbins RC (2003). A Field Guide to Western Reptiles and Amphibians, Third Edition. The Peterson Field Guide Series ®. Boston and New York: Houghton Mifflin Company. xiii + 533 pp. 56 plates. . (Senticolis triaspis, pp. 359–360 + Plate 45 + Map 149).
Stejneger L, T Barbour (1917). A Check List of North American Amphibians and Reptiles. Cambridge, Massachusetts: Harvard University Press. 125 pp. (Elaphe chlorosoma, p. 82). 
Wright, Albert Hazen; Anna Allen Wright (1957). Handbook of Snakes of the United States and Canada. Ithaca and London: Comstock Publishing Associates, a division of Cornell University Press. 1,105 pp. (in two volumes). (Elaphe triaspis, pp. 258–262, Figure 80 + Map 23 on p. 223).

Rat snakes
Monotypic snake genera